Ketchup is a sauce, commonly tomato based, used as a condiment.

Ketchup may also refer to:

Other varieties of ketchup
Banana ketchup
Curry ketchup
Fruit ketchup
Mushroom ketchup
Sweet soy sauce ("sweet ketchup") or other soy sauces

Entertainment
Ketchup: Cats Who Cook, a Japanese animated television series 1998–1999
"Ketchup" (Adventure Time), a television episode
Las Ketchup, a Spanish girl group
Ketchup, a 2013 mixtape by Mustard
Ketchup Eusebio, a Filipino actor, television host, comedian and singer
Red Ketchup, a Canadian graphic novel
Sektor, nicknamed "Ketchup", a character in the Mortal Kombat video game series

See also
:Category:Condiments

Catch Up (disambiguation)
SketchUp, a 3D modelling software